Berry is a municipality in the Canadian province of Quebec, located in the Abitibi Regional County Municipality. The municipality had a population of 538 as of the Canada 2016 Census.

The municipality includes the population centres of Saint-Gérard-de-Berry and Saint-Nazaire-de-Berry.

Geography
Berry is a municipality spread over a vast territory. It is distinguished by its many lakes and forests.

Demographics
Population trend:
 Population in 2016: 538 (2011 to 2016 population change: -13.9%)
 Population in 2011: 625 (2006 to 2011 population change: 11.6%)
 Population in 2006: 560
 Population in 2001: 489 (or 504 when adjusted to 2006 boundaries)
 Population in 1996: 501
 Population in 1991: 518

Private dwellings occupied by usual residents: 215 (total dwellings: 264)

Mother tongue:
 English as first language: 0%
 French as first language: 99.1%
 English and French as first language: 0%
 Other as first language: 0%

Municipal council
 Mayor: Jean-Pierre Naud
 Managing Director: Sandra Boutin
 Councillors: Daniel Bouchard, Florina Poulin, Lucie Gosselin, Robert Bacon, Pascal Quévillon, Andrée Bacon

References

Municipalities in Quebec
Incorporated places in Abitibi-Témiscamingue